Biff Manard (c. 1943 – May 19, 2014) was an American actor.

Background

Born in either 1939 or 1943 according to certain sources, Manard appeared in numerous movies and making guest spots on popular TV shows for many decades, such as Officer Michael Francis Murphy on The Flash, but he is perhaps best known for his role as "Hap" Ashby in the low budget science-fiction adventure Trancers, in a supporting role as a washed up baseball player, who is targeted by a psychic assassin from the future. He returned to this role in Trancers II, and in 1985 he also had reunited with co-stars Art LaFleur and Tim Thomerson for the zany Zone Troopers. He died in 2014 in Las Vegas aged 71 after being ill for quite a long time, but it is not known what ailment caused his death.

Filmography

Film

Television

References

External links
 
 

2014 deaths
American male film actors
American male comedians
Year of birth uncertain